Robinson Maneuver Training Center (Camp Robinson) a  facility located at North Little Rock, Arkansas, which houses the Joint Forces Headquarters, Arkansas National Guard, the Headquarters, Arkansas Air National Guard, Headquarters, 77th Combat Aviation Brigade, Headquarters, 87th Troop Command, Camp Pike (United States Armed Forces Reserve Complex), and is home to three Premier Training Centers, the National Guard Professional Education Center (PEC), the Guard Marksmanship Training Center (NGMTC) and the 233d Regiment (Regional Training Institute).

History

Established on 18 July 1917, the facility was originally named Camp Pike in honor of United States Army Brigadier General Zebulon Montgomery Pike. Camp construction was supervised by Major John R. Fordyce, the son of Samuel W. Fordyce. It was used for the mobilization of the 87th Division during World War I. From 1919 to 1921, Camp Pike was the home of the 3rd Division. In 1921, the 3rd Division was relocated to Camp Lewis in Washington state and the facility was transferred to the Arkansas National Guard. In 1922, the Arkansas National Guard headquarters were moved there. In 1937, it was renamed Camp Joseph T. Robinson in honor of U.S. Senator Joseph Taylor Robinson.

In 1939, discussions began to enlarge the facility and create a U.S. Army training camp there in preparation for World War II. The original buildings built for World War I were demolished, and construction of the new enlarged camp began in 1940. In 1941, it became the home base for the 35th Infantry Division. In 1943, three detention compounds with a 4,000-bed total capacity were built for German prisoners of war. In 1945, a fourth 1,100-bed compound was added. In 1946, Camp Joseph T. Robinson was returned to administration by the state of Arkansas. The Camp Pike Reserve Complex later established at Camp Robinson was named in honor of Confederate States Army Brigadier General Albert Pike.

Units

List of units at Robinson:
 77th Combat Aviation Brigade
 87th Troop Command Headquarters
 HHC, 87th Troop Command
 Recruiting and Retention Command
 106th Army Band
 61st Civil Support Team
 39th Infantry Brigade Combat Team Brigade Headquarters
 HHC, Infantry Brigade Combat Team
 Company A, 239th Brigade Engineer Battalion
 Company D, 239th Brigade Engineer Battalion
 Joint Force Headquarters
 RMTC Institute Support Unit
 Army Aviation Support Facility
 Detachment 30, Operational Support Airlift Command
 Medical Command
 233d Regiment (Regional Training Institute)
 National Guard Marksmanship Training Center
 326th Trial Defense Team

Military education

National Guard Professional Education Center
Robinson is home to the PEC and its 75-acre campus consisting of 25 buildings and a total staff of approximately 420 military, civilian contractor personnel. We annually provide instruction to over 20,000 members of the military force. The Professional Education Center also hosts over 5,000 conferees annually from the National Guard, Army Reserve, Active Army, DOD, State and Federal agencies. These conferences typically provide 3 to 5 day training sessions covering specific subjects and discussions on a wide variety of issues such as: mobilizations and deployments; standards; new tactics, techniques, and procedures; and leadership development. The Army National Guard Senior Commanders' Conference, FORSCOM Command Readiness Program Conference, Winston P. Wilson Marksmanship Competition, Training and Requirements Opportunities Sourcing Conference, Army National Guard Fixed Wing Conference, and the Army National Guard Chief of Staff Advisory Council Conference are just a few of the conferences held at PEC.

National Guard Marksmanship Training Center
The Marksmanship Training Center (MTC) programs and provides institutional training within Marksmanship related activities which will enhance effectiveness of unit level training programs in the Army and Air National Guard and missions based on the collective requirements identified by NGB-ART-I (Individual Training Branch), the Army Program for Individual Training (ARPRINT) for the Army National Guard, the United States Army Reserve (USAR), and the Active Component (AC) in support of the Army's Modular Force. Administer NGB Marksmanship training and competitive programs at all levels, stressing the development of combat skills to improve proficiency above basic marksmanship requirements and increase battlefield survivability. Provides training, training support and validation of mission essential task performance for the Army SNIPER training programs. Conduct mobile training team assistance and/or assessment visits to units. The MTC provides coordinating authority, quality assurance (QA), assessment and accreditation oversight for training responsibilities. The MTC provides for the review and development of associated TATS courseware in response to the Army's training needs and the Contemporary Operating Environment (COE). Additionally, the MTC provides operational, training, administrative, logistical, and resource management support as required to accomplish the mission to train the Army Warrior within each respective State and Territory as specified and approved by The Adjutant General (TAG).

Regional Training Institute
The 233d Regiment (Regional Training Institute) has a long and proud history. It began in 1957 with the first Officer Candidate Class. For the next 39 years the Arkansas Military Academy built a proud heritage in the Arkansas National Guard setting the standard for some of the best officers in the Army.  The RTI provides training to Soldiers from all 54 States and Territories.

In 1984, General Herbert Temple had a vision to develop a two-week course that would hone and improve the soldier combat skills needed to win on the modern battlefield. For ten years the Battle Skills School trained soldiers from all over the United States on the basic skills of survival and small unit tactics.

The Total Army School System took shape in Arkansas as the 233d Regiment (Regional Training Institute) in October 1994. The 233d RTI was organized from the Arkansas Military Academy and the Battle Skills School combining their respective TDAs.

The Mission of the RTI is to train infantry and artillery, and communications military occupational specialties, as well as non-commissioned officer education, and officer candidate school. The 233rd operates the second largest infantry school in the Army, only second to Fort Benning.  Approximately 1,930 soldiers graduated training at the RTI during Fiscal Year 06.

References

1917 establishments in Arkansas
Arkansas National Guard
Military installations in Arkansas
Buildings and structures in North Little Rock, Arkansas
Installations of the United States Army National Guard
Military installations established in 1917
Training installations of the United States Army
United States home front during World War I
United States home front during World War II
World War I sites in the United States
World War II sites in the United States